The 2022 Winter Is Coming was the third annual Winter Is Coming professional wrestling television special produced by All Elite Wrestling (AEW). The event took place on December 14, 2022, at the Curtis Culwell Center in Garland, Texas for the second consecutive year. It was broadcast live on TBS as a special episode of AEW's flagship weekly television program, Wednesday Night Dynamite.

Production

Background
Winter Is Coming is an annual television special held in December by All Elite Wrestling (AEW) since 2020, and airs as a special episode of AEW's flagship program, Wednesday Night Dynamite. The title "Winter Is Coming" is derived from Game of Thrones, a television series from HBO, which is part of Warner Bros. Discovery, which also includes AEW broadcast partners TBS and TNT. On October 12, 2022, it was announced that the third Winter Is Coming would air as the December 14 episode of Dynamite on TBS and would again take place at the Curtis Culwell Center in Garland, Texas for the second consecutive year. The December 16 episode of Friday Night Rampage on TNT was taped the same night following the live broadcast of Winter Is Coming.

Storylines
Winter Is Coming featured professional wrestling matches that involved different wrestlers from pre-existing scripted feuds and storylines. Wrestlers portrayed heroes, villains, or less distinguishable characters in scripted events that built tension and culminated in a wrestling match or series of matches. Storylines were produced on AEW's weekly television programs, Dynamite and Rampage, the supplementary online streaming shows, Dark and Elevation, and The Young Bucks' YouTube series Being The Elite.

On the November 23 episode of Dynamite, Ricky Starks defeated Ethan Page in the finals of the AEW World Championship Eliminator Tournament to earn a match against MJF for the AEW World Championship at Winter Is Coming. On the December 7 episode, the Dynamite Diamond Battle Royale took place. As MJF had won the AEW Dynamite Diamond Ring the last three years, he got a bye in the battle royale, with the winner facing MJF for the ring. Starks would also win the battle royale. It was then announced that the match at Winter Is Coming would be a Winner Takes All match for both the AEW World Championship and the Dynamite Diamond Ring.

At Full Gear, Death Triangle (Pac, Penta El Zero Miedo, and Rey Fénix) defeated The Elite (Kenny Omega, Matt Jackson, and Nick Jackson) to retain the AEW World Trios Championship. Afterwards, it was announced that the Full Gear match was the first in a Best of Seven Series for the championship. Death Triangle would again defeat The Elite on the following episode of Dynamite, but The Elite gained a win on the next week's episode. The fourth match in the series was scheduled for Winter Is Coming.

Aftermath
With Death Triangle's (Pac, Penta El Zero Miedo, and Rey Fénix) win over The Elite (Kenny Omega, Matt Jackson, and Nick Jackson), it brought the series to 3–1, with the fifth match scheduled for Dynamite: Holiday Bash as a No Disqualification match.

Results

AEW World Championship Eliminator Tournament

References

External links

2022
2020s American television specials
2022 American television episodes
2022 in professional wrestling
December 2022 events in the United States
2022 in Texas
Events in Garland, Texas
Professional wrestling in Texas